The Great People's Assembly of Serbs, Bunjevci and other Slavs in Banat, Bačka and Baranja or Novi Sad Assembly was an assembly held in Novi Sad on 25 November 1918, which proclaimed the unification of Banat, Bačka and Baranya with the Kingdom of Serbia.

The end of World War I 
After the capitulation of the German Empire in World War I (1918), a series of mass agreements began, which were reached in the next 5 years. Each agreement was intended for a specific country on the side of the Central Powers (Germany, Austria-Hungary, the Ottoman Empire and Bulgaria). Immediately after the agreements related to Germany, it was the turn of Austria-Hungary. The forthcoming agreements implied the division of the former territories of Austria-Hungary into several states and self-governing areas (besides the Austria and Hungary, the State of Slovenes, Croats and Serbs, Banat, Bačka and Baranja, Srem and many others, etc.)

When the peace negotiations ended, the Kingdom of Serbia started to carry out an offensive in the Délvidék and began the occupation. The inhabitants of almost all settlements experienced the Serbian Army as liberators and Serbian soldiers did not use any form of violence while marching to the largest cities in the region. After the annexation of Bačka and Baranya and the so-called Great People's Assembly of Serbs, Bunjevci and other Slavs was formed in Banat, Bačka and Baranja, which took full or partial control of these areas.

Convening the assembly 

After the collapse of the Austro-Hungarian monarchy in October 1918, the regions of Banat, Bačka and Baranja were occupied by the army of the Kingdom of Serbia. The de facto administration of these areas was taken over by local Vojvodina Serbs, and the Serbian People's Committee from Novi Sad was at the head of this administration.

On 25 November 1918 the Great People's Assembly of Serbs, Bunjevci and other Slavs was convened in Banat, Bačka and Baranja, which declared the accession of these regions to the Kingdom of Serbia (there were a total of 757 delegates at the assembly, of which 578 Serbs, 84 Bunjevci , 62 Slovaks, 21 Ruthenians, 6 Germans, 3 Šokci, 2 Croats and 1 Hungarian), and on 1 December 1918, the Kingdom of Serbia united with the State of Slovenes, Croats and Serbs to form the Kingdom of Serbs, Croats and Slovenes. The assembly was held in Novi Sad, in the hotel "Grand Hotel Meyer" (today's building of Vojvođanska banka) and among the delegates were seven women.

According to the proclamation published on 17 November, Serbs, Bunjevci and other Slavs, both sexes, over the age of twenty, had the right to vote at the Great People's Assembly. Deputies were elected by municipalities, one deputy per thousand citizens, and they were elected by public assembly, by acclamation.

The Grand National Assembly was opened by the uniate priest Jovan Hranilović as the oldest MP by age. Members of the Assembly represented 211 municipalities from Banat, Bačka and Baranja, and the session was also attended by representatives of Srem, members of the SNO Novi Sad, as well as Serbian and French officers who found themselves in Novi Sad. After the constitution of the Assembly was completed, the presidency was taken over by Ignjat Pavlas, who announced Jaša Tomić, the president of the SNO Novi Sad, as the submitter of the main decision. Jaša Tomić first addressed this historical gathering with a short speech, and then read the decisions of the Assembly.

The Grand National Assembly not only declared the unification of Banat, Bačka and Baranja with the Kingdom of Serbia, but also made a decision on the formation of a provincial administration (government and assembly) in these regions. The provincial government was officially named People's Administration for Banat, Bačka and Baranja, and Jovan Lalošević was elected its president, while the provincial assembly was officially called the "Great People's Council", whose president was elected Slavko Miletić.

Decisions of the Assembly 

Excerpts from the decisions of the Assembly:

 We ask the government of brotherly Serbia to represent our interests at the Peace Congress.
 We join the Kingdom of Serbia, which with its work and development so far guarantees freedom, equality, progress in every direction, not only to us, but also to all Slavic and even non-Slavic peoples who live with us.
 Non-Serb and non-Slavic peoples, who remain within our borders, are provided with every right, by which they want to preserve and develop their national being as a minority.
 Banat, Bačka and Baranja within the borders, withdrawn by the Entente's Balkan army, were proclaimed today, November 12 (25), 1918, at the Great People's Assembly, on the basis of the sublime principle of people's self-determination, seceded, both in state-legal, political and economic terms from Hungary.
 That is why the National Assembly appoints the Grand National Council, whose executive body is the People's Administration.
 The National Council consists of 50 members, elected from this National Assembly. The People's Council issues the necessary decrees and orders, appoints the National Administration and supervises it.
 The people's administration will manage the designated territory on the basis of the principles of complete freedom and equality for all peoples. Every citizen has the indisputable right to communicate with all authorities in their mother tongue.
 The seat of the Great People's Council and the People's Administration is Novi Sad.

The division of the provinces between Serbia, Romania and Hungary 
With the end of World War I, there were even bigger disputes between the states that had claims to certain territories. One of the biggest disputes on some of the territories of the Kingdom of Hungary was actually between Serbia and Romania. On the territory of the former Austrian crownland of the Voivodeship of Serbia and Banat of Temeschwar there was a big Serb population but also a large number of Romanians and Ruthenians. The Kingdom of Serbia took over this area. However, with good diplomatic relations, the two countries found an adequate partition. According to the agreements that were previously signed, Hungary was also entitled to retain some of this territory, which eventually was concluded. Soon after this, the Kingdom of Serbs, Croats and Slovenes will be formed and territorial disputes with the Kingdom of Italy will be resolved very quickly. After that, the Kingdom of SCS was divided into several administrative areas and received international recognition.

See also 

 Podgorica Assembly
 State of Slovenes, Croats and Serbs
 Kingdom of Serbs, Croats and Slovenes

References

Literature 

 Drago Njegovan, Prisajedinjenje Vojvodine Srbiji, Novi Sad, 2004.
 
 
 
 
 

Kingdom of Serbia
History of Serbia
History of Vojvodina
History of Banat
Austria-Hungary
Serbia in World War I
National unifications
1918 conferences